Salisbury is a southern suburb in the City of Brisbane, Queensland, Australia.

Geography 

Toohey Mountain and Toohey Mountain Reserve is located on the north east boundary of the suburb.

Today, Salisbury is an established residential and industrial area, with substantial park lands in the north.

History
Salisbury was named after the residence of William Coote, an early Brisbane engineer, architect, journalist and political figure, who lived in the area. It is presumed to refer to Salisbury in England.

The Beenleigh railway line opened in 1885 which included the Salisbury railway station to service the area.

Rocklea started to develop before Salisbury, with the Logan Railway estate auctioned on 2 May 1885, advertising that the estate was near Salisbury railway station.

On 20 July 1912, The main Salisbury Township Estate, Salisbury located off Main Road (now known as Lilian Avenue) was advertised to be sold on site, by Arthur Blackwood. The estate consisted of 442 predominantly 32 perch (800m2) blocks, consisting of the entire area between Lillian Ave, Cripps Street, Fairlie Terrace and Rocky Water Holes.

On 23 November 1918, Mountain View Estate, Salisbury located off Main Road (now known as Lilian Avenue) was advertised to be auctioned at 3 o'clock on site, by auctioneer A. S. Phillips & Sons Ltd. The estate consisted of 26 half-acre allotments and four two-acre blocks.  he allotments were advertised as situated on a high position between Salisbury and Coopers Plains railway stations and opposite the site purchased by the Queensland Government for the proposed State School.

Salisbury State School opened on 27 May 1920.

The School Estate Salisbury was advertised for auction on Saturday 14 May 1921. 75 residential sites were sold by Cameron Brothers next to Salisbury State School and within 10 minutes walk to Salisbury Railway station.The Waratah Heights Estate was sold on 17 May 1924 by Arthur Blackwood Ltd. There were 90 suburban lots in the vicinity of Golda Avenue.

The area remained predominantly rural until after the Second World War.  Because of its comparative remoteness, a series of munition factories were built in the area, along what is now Evans Road.  The tram line from the city to Moorooka was extended in 1941 to Evans Road to service these factories.  The tram line finally closed on 13 April 1969.

By the end of October 1943, the production of small arms at the Rocklea Factory had ceased and the place was ready for re-occupation and conversion to engine overhaul for the Department of Aircraft Production. Provision was also made for the establishment on the site of the Salisbury Hotel.

On 12 December 1997, it was amalgamated with Acacia Ridge State High School to create the Nyanda State High School on the site of the Salisbury State High School. Nyanda State High School closed in 2013.

In 1955, Orange Grove Road was extended north from the eastern end of Lillian Avenue to connect to the eastern end of Evans Road. Toohey Road linked Salisbury to Tarragindi in September 1959. Significant residential development occurred during the post-war years, with rapid growth from the 1960s.

St Pius X Catholic School opened in 1964. The school was operated by the Sisters of St Joseph of the Sacred Heart until 1981 after which it was under lay leadership.

Southside Christian College opened at 109A Golda Avenue on 15 April 1985 with 16 primary students. In 2011 the school was renamed Brisbane Christian College. In June 2015 the school purchased the site of the former Nyanda State High School at 63 Fairlie Terrace for their middle and senior school campus.

St Mary Magdalene Anglican Church at 243-245 Douglas Road was dedicated on 21 July 1997 by Archbishop Felix Arnott, replacing a World War II army hut. Its last service was held on 23 February 2014 due to a declining congregation. A deconsecration ceremony was conducted by Locum Bishop Godfrey Fryar on 28 February 2018. The first church in the district opened in a tent in 1921.

The median age of the Salisbury population was 35 years, three years below the Australian median. 67.8% of people living in Salisbury were born in Australia, compared to the national average of 66.7%. The other top responses for country of birth were India (4.0%), New Zealand (2.8%), England (2.6%), China (1.9%) and Vietnam (0.8%). 74.2% of people spoke only English at home; the next most popular languages were Mandarin (2.4%), Cantonese (1.4%), Punjabi and Spanish (both 1.2%) and Gujarati (1.0).

Heritage listings
There are a number of heritage-listed sites in the suburb, including:
 45 Assembly Street: former Rocklea  Munitions Works - Shell Machining Shop & Air Raid Shelter

 9 Chrome Street: former Rocklea  Munitions Works - Oil Store and Lead Press

 18 Chrome Street: former Rocklea  Munitions Works - S.A.A. Mess

 32 Commerce Street: former Rocklea  Munitions Works - S.A.A. Case & Assembly Shop
 100A Dollis Street:  Salisbury Railway Station ticket office & footbridge (part)

 21 Engineering Street: former Rocklea  Munitions Works - Laboratory

 Evans Road (road reserve): former Rocklea  Munitions Works - Northern Guard House

 50 Evans Road: former Rocklea Munitions  Works - Chronograph House & Velocity Range Building

 124 Evans Road: former Rocklea  Munitions Works - Staff Mess

 145 Evans Road: former Rocklea  Munitions Works - Southern Guard House

 145 Henson Road: 145 Henson Road,  Salisbury

 32 Industries Road: former Rocklea  Munitions Works - Magazine 8A

 9 Precision Street: former Rocklea  Munitions Works - Electrical Workshop

 23 Precision Street: former Rocklea  Munitions Works - Tools & Gauges building

Facilities
Major features of the area include Toohey Forest, Toohey Mountain, The Construction Training Centre, SkillsTech Australia (Salisbury Campus), Brisbane Christian College, Life Church, Russ Hall Park and a number of local schools, shops, aged care facilities, clubs and sporting facilities. The area is serviced by both a railway station and a number of bus routes connecting to Brisbane central business district and surrounding areas.

Salisbury railway station provides access to regular Queensland Rail City network services to Brisbane and Beenleigh.

The book publishing company Boolarong Press has its headquarters in the suburb.

Education 
Salisbury State School is a government primary (Prep-6) school for boys and girls at 19 Cripps Street. In 2017, the school had an enrolment of 256 students with 22 teachers (17 full-time equivalent) and 17 non-teaching staff (11 full-time equivalent).

St Pius X School is a Catholic primary (Prep-6) school for boys and girls at 73 Golda Avenue. In 2019, the school had an enrolment of 150 students with 13 teachers (10 full-time equivalent) and 11 non-teaching staff (6 full-time equivalent).

Brisbane Christian College is a private primary and secondary school (Prep-12) school for boys and girls. It has its Prep-5 campus at 99-109 Golda Avenue and its 6-12 campus at 63 Fairlie Terrace. In 2017, the school had an enrolment of 820 students with 58 teachers (52 full-time equivalent) and 79 non-teaching staff (38 full-time equivalent).

There is no government secondary school in Salisbury. The nearest government  secondary schools are: 

 Holland Park State High School in Holland Park West to the north-east
 Sunnybank State High School in Sunnybank to the south-east
 Yeronga State High School in Yeronga to the north-west

Residential
Housing predominantly consists of a variety of detached dwellings on various lot sizes, ranging from traditional Queenslander style homes on 800 meters squared to modern style homes on 400 meters squared.

The area is undergoing change and renewal with many families seeking to make it their home.

References

Further reading

External links

 
 

Suburbs of the City of Brisbane